Blasko is both a given name and a surname. Notable people with the name include:

Blaško Rajić (1878–1951), Croat priest, writer, and politician
Milan Blaško (1961–2016), Slovak ski mountaineer
Sarah Blasko (born 1976), Australian musician
Bela Lugosi, born Béla Ferenc Dezső Blaskó

See also
Blasco
Rob Nicholson (musician) (born 1969), nicknamed "Blasko"